Edward Amatrudo (born February 9, 1956) is an American actor, best known for his role as Glenn Goodman, Juliette Barnes's manager, in the ABC television drama series, Nashville. He appeared on a recurring basis starting with the pilot episode, aired in October 2012.

Amatrudo graduated from American Academy of Dramatic Arts and in the 1980s and 90s appeared in a number of theatre and screen productions. He guest-starred on NYPD Blue, Chicago Hope, Profiler and Walker, Texas Ranger, and also had roles in films Chains of Gold (1991), Traces of Red (1992), Wrestling Ernest Hemingway (1993), Drop Zone (1994), Bad Boys (1995), Up Close & Personal (1996) and Bully (2001).

In 2000s, Amatrudo worked as real estate broker in Nashville. In 2010s he returned to acting appearing in Drop Dead Diva and Army Wives before his role in Nashville. Amatrudo also played the role of Clive Davis in the 2013 television film, CrazySexyCool: The TLC Story. In 2022, he made a guest appearance in the 4th season of Stranger Things.

References

External links

American male television actors
American male film actors
Living people
American Academy of Dramatic Arts alumni
20th-century American male actors
21st-century American male actors
Year of birth missing (living people)